Krasnoye Zvedeniye is a rural locality (a village) in Krasnopolyanskoye Rural Settlement, Nikolsky District, Vologda Oblast, Russia. The population was 25 as of 2002.

Geography 
Krasnoye Zvedeniye is located 26 km west of Nikolsk (the district's administrative centre) by road. Molodyozhny is the nearest rural locality.

References 

Rural localities in Nikolsky District, Vologda Oblast